Qualea elegans is a species of flowering plants in the family Vochysiaceae. It is found in Brazil.

References

External links 

 Qualea elegans at The Plant List
 Qualea elegans at Tropicos

elegans
Flora of Brazil
Plants described in 1915